Cornelio Masciadri (25 October 1923 – 2 January 2008) was an Italian politician who served as Mayor of Novara (1962–1967), Deputy (1968–1976) and Senator (1979–1992).

References

1923 births
2008 deaths
Mayors of Novara
Deputies of Legislature V of Italy
Deputies of Legislature VI of Italy
Senators of Legislature VIII of Italy
Senators of Legislature IX of Italy
Senators of Legislature X of Italy
20th-century Italian politicians
Italian Socialist Party politicians